Wyrm may refer to:

Folklore 
 Germanic dragon, a creature from which the modern word originated
 Dragon
 Sea serpent

Media 
 Wyrms (comics), a six-issue comic book mini-series by Orson Scott Card and Jake Black
 Wyrm (film), a 2020 American comedy film
 Wyrms (novel), a 1987 science fiction novel by Orson Scott Card
 Wyrm (TMNT), a mutated garbageman in Teenage Mutant Ninja Turtles
 Wyrm (World of Darkness), the bringer of the apocalypse in the role-playing game Werewolf: The Apocalypse
 Former callsign of Norfolk, Virginia radio station WTJZ

See also
 Wurm (disambiguation)